The Honor Society of Phi Kappa Phi (or simply Phi Kappa Phi or ) is an honor society established in 1897 to recognize and encourage superior scholarship without restriction as to area of study, and to promote the "unity and democracy of education". It is the fourth academic society in the United States to be organized around recognizing academic excellence, and it is the oldest all-discipline honor society. It is a member of the Honor Society Caucus, which is composed of four honor societies: Phi Beta Kappa, Phi Kappa Phi, Sigma Xi, and Omicron Delta Kappa.

Membership
Membership is by invitation only, by an established campus chapter, and is restricted to students with integrity and high ethical standards and who are ranked scholastically in the top of their class, regardless of field of study: the top 7.5 percent of second-semester university juniors and the top 10 percent of seniors and graduate students. Faculty, professional staff and alumni who have achieved scholarly distinction also might be eligible.

Phi Kappa Phi claims to have over 100,000 active members, to initiate approximately 30,000 new members annually, and to have a total of more than 1 million members since its creation, from over 300 college-based chapters in the United States, Puerto Rico, and the Philippines.

History

In the late 1800s, there were only two academic societies founded and organized as honor societies, and they were discipline specific – Tau Beta Pi and Sigma Xi, which were founded in 1885 and 1886, respectively.  There was also Phi Beta Kappa, a social and literary society that did not originate as an honor society when it was founded in 1776 but would soon become one for the liberal arts and sciences.  Although Phi Beta Kappa was not exclusive to one discipline, it did not extend its membership beyond the liberal arts and sciences, hence the establishment of Tau Beta Pi, an honor society for engineering.  Phi Beta Kappa became sufficient as an all-campus honor society for liberal arts colleges, but there was no honor society that could serve as such for the universities encompassing both liberal education and also technological and professional education, a mission to which the newly burgeoning land-grant universities of the time were dedicated.  That was to change in 1897 when the first organizational meeting of Lambda Sigma Eta (later named Phi Kappa Phi), the nation's first all-discipline honor society, was held in Coburn Hall at the University of Maine under the leadership of undergraduate student Marcus L. Urann.  In opposition to what he saw as the separateness and exclusivity promoted by the social fraternities and discipline bound honor societies, Urann wanted to create a society that was defined by inclusiveness and that unified a campus, constituted by "high rank men drawn from all classes and all groups and all societies".   Those selected for invitation into the society would be the top ten students of the senior class whose rank did not fall below the 90th percentile for the four years of work at the university.  In all, the society was founded by 10 senior students, two faculty members, and the university president, Abram Winegaard Harris. Urann graduated in 1897, and leadership of Phi Kappa Phi was assumed by President Harris. A year or so later, the name was changed to the Morrill Society, in honor of the sponsor of the Congressional Act which provided for land-grant universities.  In 1899, the first woman was initiated into the society, Pearl Clayton Swain.

In 1900, the society became national in scope by action of the presidents of the University of Maine (the founding chapter), University of Tennessee, and Pennsylvania State University. There was considerable debate among the three existing chapters regarding the purpose and naming of the society. Pennsylvania State University's President George W. Atherton cautioned that using Greek letters to label the society would be "too much like aping other organizations", and President Charles W. Dabney of the University of Tennessee did not want to accept institutions that already had a chapter of Phi Beta Kappa. Nonetheless, on June 12, 1900, the society changed its name to Phi Kappa Phi, drawing from the initial letters of the Greek words forming its motto.  The year 1900 also saw the first national convention of Phi Kappa Phi, which was held in New Haven, Connecticut and attended by delegates representing the three original chapters.  In 1915, Phi Kappa Phi continued to struggle to earn a reputation.  The then Secretary of the organization, L.H. Pammel, pointed out that institutions that were seeking to establish a chapter of Phi Beta Kappa were often hesitant about establishing a chapter of Phi Kappa Phi. To this, the society continued to make its case:
Phi Beta Kappa, it was repeated time after time, represented the literary side of education such as history, literature, and economics."The Phi Kappa Phi on the other hand stands not only for the democracy of education, making no distinction between different lines of investigation, such as literature, history, science, home economics, agriculture, veterinary medicine, law, but for sound scholarship based on four years of collegiate work."
It would later be asserted that the society's aim is not to replace older societies, but to "help raise the broader educational program initiated by our government when it established the land-grant system, to appreciation of scholarly worth whether the subject matter be strictly academic or of a more vocational type."

1915 was the same year the first issue of The Phi Kappa Phi Journal was published, and also the year the society established an association with the American Association for the Advancement of Science that would last until 1962. In 1919, Phi Kappa Phi still struggled with securing growth and in the spirit of "the unity and democracy of education" the leadership took the stance that "although certain honor societies like Phi Beta Kappa and Sigma Xi are unwilling to venture out into these technical schools", Phi Kappa Phi should push to become part of those institutions. In 1922, the question of admitting African-Americans into the society was raised openly, and the leadership decided that although the constitution did not debar African-Americans, the society would not "urge the election of colored people" because the "southern institutions would resent it." Nonetheless, in 1925 the society as a whole formally took the position that it would not discriminate on color or race. Yet it would take until 1976 for Phi Kappa Phi to successfully establish a chapter at a Historically Black College or University, when one was established at Jackson State University.  Also in 1925, Phi Kappa Phi would be instrumental in creating the Association of College Honor Societies (ACHS), being one of its six charter members.

In 1933, while the Philippines was still an American colony, the first chapter outside of the continental United States was founded at the University of the Philippines.  About this time, president of the society Frank D. Kern stated that "integrity, moral courage, spirited discernment, and concern for human welfare" were equally important for membership in the society.

During the two world wars and into the 1960s, Society membership numbers and finances struggled.  In 1963, Chapter 105 was chartered at the oldest and largest university system in the American territory of Puerto Rico, Universidad de Puerto Rico.  By 1969, new member numbers were triple what they were in 1960.  That year, the Phi Kappa Phi Foundation was incorporated to promote academic excellence and achievement by means of scholarships and fellowships. To support first-year graduate work, the society now offers annually through the Foundation 60 Fellowships and 30 Awards of Excellence, on a competitive basis, to graduating students who have been initiated into the society and who have also been nominated by their chapters for the competition.

In a 1969 Special Convention, the motto devised in 1900, "The Love of Learning Rules all Mankind", was changed to "Let the Love of Learning Rule Mankind" due to membership insistence that the former was, in the words of one member, "the most barefaced lie that had ever been cast in bronze."

By 1971, 74 years after its founding, Phi Kappa Phi numbered 120 chapters.  In the next 12 years, that number would double to 239.

Mission
Phi Kappa Phi's mission is "to recognize and promote academic excellence in all fields of higher education and to engage the community of scholars in service to others."  In honoring "those persons of good character who have excelled in scholarship, in whatever field, it will stimulate others to strive for excellence."  To this end, the society insists that "in order to acquire a chapter ... an institution provide the means and atmosphere conducive to academic excellence." Furthermore, the society awards more than $1.3 million in national and local scholarships annually, as well as grants and graduate fellowships.  According to Baird's Manual of College Fraternities, the aim of these awards "is not to give the recipient something which may encourage complacency, but to challenge the member to continued excellence."

According to the website of the National Association of Fellowships Advisors, "The multidisciplinary nature of Phi Kappa Phi is reflected in its Fellowship and Award of Excellence recipients. Awardees represent a variety of fields including biology, chemistry, engineering, political science, mathematics and psychology. Likewise, the professions they select are equally diverse: law, medicine, business, education, science, or the arts".  This multidisciplinary nature is represented by the rays of light on the Phi Kappa Phi badge (see "Society Symbols" below).  In addition, Phi Kappa Phi aims to foster community service and leadership through its grants for local and national literacy initiatives, promotion of excellence grants, and training and leadership opportunities available to its membership.

Some chapters of Phi Kappa Phi also sponsor conferences and campus speakers.

Publications 
Phi Kappa Phi publishes for its active membership a quarterly journal, The Phi Kappa Phi Forum and the triannual Honor Chord e-zine, both of which have won awards.    The society also publishes the Monthly Mentions newsletter.  Each issue of The Phi Kappa Phi Forum is devoted to a significant theme and addresses prominent issues of the day from an interdisciplinary perspective. The journal features articles by scholars inside and outside the academic community. In addition to timely articles, each issue of The Phi Kappa Phi Forum contains selected poetry and reviews of current books and periodical literature.  The Honor Chord e-zine and Phi Kappa Phi Newsletter feature professional advice columns and news items of interest to members on both the national and local levels.

Notable people who have contributed to The Phi Kappa Phi Forum include Ronald Reagan, Bob Dole, Edward Kennedy, Jesse Jackson, Sr., Newt Gingrich, Myrlie Evers-Williams, Michael Dukakis, Thomas "Tip" O'Neill, Annette Kolodny, Warren E. Burger, Ellis Marsalis, Jr., and Molefi Kete Asante.

Organization and governance 
Phi Kappa Phi is governed ultimately by the Biennial Convention, supplemented by any interim  – though rare – special conventions deemed necessary. Each chapter may send one official delegates to a convention, which is held at a major city in the United States. Between conventions, the business of the society is conducted by the board of directors, composed of 12 people, of whom 11 are elective (president, president-elect, a vice president of development, five directors, two student representatives, and the immediate past president) and one is appointive (executive director of the society). The executive director is in charge of the society's national office.

Each of the 300 active chapters of Phi Kappa Phi elect their own set of chapter officers and is governed by the chapter constitution and by-laws.  Chapters are numbered chronologically based on their date of founding, with the oldest chapter at the University of Maine identified as Chapter 001.

Phi Kappa Phi is a 501(c)(3) organization under the United States Internal Revenue Code. Its national headquarters is located in Baton Rouge, Louisiana.

Presidents

The following served as president of the society since its founding:

Symbols

The Badge
 The badge, which appears on the key and in the center of the society's seal, is the terrestrial globe with the sun's eight-rayed corona extending behind it. The sun represents the dissemination of truth and knowledge as light. The eight-rayed sun represents the various branches into which general education at the time was divided, and the arrangement of the rays "stood for the unity and democracy of the various branches of learning"  Encompassing the globe is a band with the Greek letters Phi(Φ) Kappa(K) Phi(Φ), representing the honor society's motto,  (Philosophía Krateítõ Phõtôn). This band represents the bond of fellowship that binds all lovers of learning in a common purpose.

The seal
The seal of the society has at its center the badge. This in turn is surrounded by a crenelated line which represents the battlements and walls of Troy as well as a technological aspect of the ancient Greek culture. In the space between this line and the periphery of the seal appear three stars just above the badge, one for each of the three original chapters. Just below the badge is the phrase "Founded 1897."

The ribbon
  The ribbon of the society portrays the meander pattern common in Greek art, suggesting the enduring values and ideals of learning and community leadership promoted by Phi Kappa Phi.

Notable members

References

External links 
Phi Kappa Phi
The Political Graveyard: Phi Kappa Phi Politicians
Phi Kappa Phi records University of Maryland Chapter at the University of Maryland Libraries 

Honor societies
Student organizations established in 1897
1897 establishments in Maine
Former members of Association of College Honor Societies